Dwaine may refer to:

First names
Dwaine Board (born 1956), American football coach
Dwaine Carpenter (born 1976), retired American football player who also played Canadian football
Dwaine Wilson (born 1960), American retired Canadian football player

Middle names
Howard Dwaine Dorough (born 1973), American singer-songwriter, dancer, musician, entertainer, actor, and businessman
Michael Dwaine Phillips (born 1950), American Major League Baseball player

See also
Dwayne